The 2015–16 Kentucky Wildcats women's basketball team will represent University of Kentucky during the 2015–16 NCAA Division I women's basketball season. The Wildcats, led by ninth year head coach Matthew Mitchell, play their home games at the Memorial Coliseum with two games at Rupp Arena and were members of the Southeastern Conference. They finished the season 25–8, 10–6 in SEC play to finish in a tie for fourth place. They advanced to the semifinals of the SEC women's tournament where they lost to South Carolina. They received an at-large to the NCAA women's tournament where they defeated UNC Asheville and Oklahoma in the first and second rounds before getting upset by Washington the sweet sixteen.

Roster

Schedule

|-
!colspan=9 style="background:#273BE2; color:white;"| Exhibition

|-
!colspan=9 style="background:#273BE2; color:white;"| Non-conference regular season

|-
!colspan=9 style="background:#273BE2; color:white;"| SEC regular season

|-
!colspan=9 style="text-align: center; background:#273BE2"| SEC Women's Tournament

|-
!colspan=9 style="text-align: center; background:#273BE2"| NCAA Women's Tournament

Rankings

See also
 2015–16 Kentucky Wildcats men's basketball team
 Kentucky Wildcats women's basketball

References

Kentucky
Kentucky
Kentucky Wildcats women's basketball seasons
Kentucky Wildcats women's basketball
Kentucky Wild
Kentucky Wild